The Jersey Shore (known by locals simply as the Shore) is the coastal region of the U.S. state of New Jersey. The region includes Middlesex, Monmouth, Ocean, Atlantic, and Cape May counties, which are in the central and southern parts of the state. Located in the center of the Northeast Megalopolis, the northern half of the shore region is part of the New York metropolitan area, while the southern half of the shore region is part of the Delaware Valley, a.k.a. the Philadelphia metropolitan area. The Jersey Shore hosts the highest concentration of oceanside boardwalks in the United States.

Famous for its many boardwalks with arcades, amusement parks, and water parks boasting hundreds of rides and attractions, the Jersey Shore is a popular vacation spot with residents of North Jersey, New York, Maryland, Delaware, Connecticut, and Pennsylvania. Certain shore communities are also popular with visitors of the Canadian province of Quebec. Due to New Jersey's peninsular geography, both sunrise and sunset are visible over water from different points on the Jersey Shore.

Hurricane Sandy in 2012 devastated much of the northern part of the region, spawning the demolition and rebuilding of entire neighborhoods, with reinvention on a physically and financially elevated, and economically upscale level; this process of gentrification is rapidly escalating property values and transforming many communities on the Jersey Shore into a second home for the New York financial community, akin to the more established Gold Coast and Hamptons on Long Island.

Notable shore towns

The Jersey Shore is lined with over 40 different towns and communities, each with a different character, flavor, and vibe. Many towns cater extensively to summer tourists, while others are increasingly or completely full-year residential communities. The towns listed below are ordered geographically from north to south.

Middlesex County

The Amboys

Perth Amboy, along with neighboring South Amboy across the Raritan River, make up The Amboys. Perth Amboy was a resort town in the 19th century and early 20th century, located on the northern edge of the Raritan Bayshore. Since the early 1990s Perth Amboy has seen redevelopment. Small businesses have started to open up, helped by the city's designation as an urban enterprise zone. The waterfront has also seen a rebirth, with new parks, a new promenade and an expansion of the marina complementing the old Victorian homes along the bay. Local attractions include the Perth Amboy Ferry Slip and Kearny Cottage. The Raritan Yacht Club, it is one of the oldest yacht clubs in the United States.

Laurence Harbor (Old Bridge)

Laurence Harbor is an unincorporated community located in Old Bridge. The waterfront neighborhood looks directly upon Staten Island's southern shore; the Verrazano-Narrows Bridge, Lower Manhattan (including the Empire State Building, on a clear night), and Brooklyn can also be seen. The railroad ch no longer has a station in Laurence Harbor. It had a Morgan station during most of the 1st half of the 20th century, located right across Cheesequake Creek, sometimes referred to locally as "The Front", from Laurence Harbor, dividing the community into eastern and western sections. Cliffwood Beach also borders Laurence Harbor when traveling south. Morgan is named after the 1703 family that had 645 acres (2.61 km2) here and were cousins of the infamous pirate captain Henry Morgan. Morgan is located one mile to the northwest, across the Cheesequake Creek and the Morgan Bridge on New Jersey Route 35. The Morgan Draw carries the North Jersey Coast Line.

Laurence Harbor is home to Old Bridge Waterfront Park, which consists of a new boardwalk (the old boardwalk was destroyed in the 1940–1950s) that was completed in 2002. The beachfront was redone through a joint venture by Old Bridge Township, New Jersey, and Middlesex County Parks Department. It extends approximately one mile from the Old Bridge Police substation south, to the Aberdeen Township neighborhood of Cliffwood Beach, and runs parallel with New Jersey Route 35. This area is very popular for fishing as three jetties extend into Raritan Bay and are in excellent condition, also recently redone in the past ten years. The park's boardwalk is also popular for jogging and dog walking. At the northern parking lot of the park, there is bay beach swimming access along with a bathroom and showers.

Monmouth County

Keansburg
Keansburg was a popular early 20th century summertime destination for tourists from New York City, who would cross the Raritan Bay on steamboats to escape the city heat. Hurricane Donna wiped out much of the waterfront area in 1960, and a number of fires in the 1980s destroyed many of the town's main attractions, including the Dance Hall Auditorium, the Keansburg Bowling Alley, and the Casino Theater.

The Keansburg Amusement Park, founded in 1904, started a massive expansion project in 1995. Upgrades were made to the park and an adjacent water park, Runaway Rapids, was constructed

Atlantic Highlands

The Manhattan skyline can be seen from the borough's ridges and its shoreline. Pleasure, fishing, and commuter boats sail from its harbor, which was built from 1938 through 1940. It is the largest on the East Coast.

SeaStreak ferry
Atlantic Highlands is home to 715 craft, including the high-speed SeaStreak ferry service to New York City, which was introduced in 1986. SeaStreak ferry provides high-speed commuter service for residents on the Raritan Bayshore in northern Monmouth County to Manhattan in New York City. The ferry also offers seasonal sightseeing excursions. Many Jersey Shore residents board the ferry to travel to different points across the Tri-State area and New England coastline. Many New York residents board the ferry to travel to Atlantic Highlands and Sandy Hook Beach, along with the rest of the Jersey Shore region at large.

Sandy Hook (Middletown)

Sandy Hook is a long, narrow largely undeveloped barrier spit, most of which is owned and managed by the National Park Service as a unit of the Gateway National Recreation Area. The eastern, ocean-facing shoreline consists of various public and fishing beaches and serves as a Shore gateway and popular destination for recreation in summer when seasonal SeaStreak ferries bring beachgoers. Sandy Hook's Gunnison Beach is one of the largest clothing-optional beaches on the East Coast. The northern end of the peninsula is home to the Sandy Hook Lighthouse, the Marine Academy of Science and Technology, and the restored buildings of Fort Hancock, a former United States Army base. Spread across Sandy Hook are former military installations, including four ammunition bunkers, two gun stations, and a Nike Missile Base.

Red Bank
Red Bank, overlooking the Navesink River, is a noted social and commercial destination, filled with boutiques, designer clothing stores, parks, and restaurants. The town is also considered a center of artistic activity and is home to the Monmouth County Arts Council, as well as the Count Basie Theatre, Two River Theater, and several art galleries. Various festivals held by the town, including the Red Bank Jazz & Blues Festival, draw tourists throughout the year.

Boating, sculling, sailing, and fishing are popular outdoor activities in Red Bank; in the winter, ice boats sail on the Navesink when it freezes over. The Monmouth Boat Club, Marine Park, and the slips of the Molly Pitcher Inn provide access to the river and, from there, the Atlantic Ocean.

Oceanport

Oceanport is an upper-middle-class bedroom community located on the Shrewsbury River, between Red Bank and Long Branch. It is the home of Monmouth Park Racetrack, one of the oldest thoroughbred racing tracks in the country.

The original racing track was opened by the Monmouth Park Association on July 30, 1870, in nearby Eatontown to increase summer tourism for communities along the Shore. Monmouth Park early on earned the nickname as the "Newmarket of America" due to the excellence of its racing. However, after three years of being open financial issues caused the track to close. In 1878, the track was bought by David D. Withers, George L. Lorillard, James Gordon Bennett, Jr., and George P. Wetmore. The men spent four years renovating the grounds and grandstand and reopened Monmouth Park in 1882. From 1882 to 1890, the track increased in popularity and as a result, a new racetrack was constructed next to the original. The new racetrack opened in 1890 becoming the second Monmouth Park. However, legislation proposed in 1891 and enacted in 1894 barred parimutuel betting in New Jersey, and the track closed its doors. It was not until 1946 when the New Jersey Legislature passed a bill providing for state regulation of horse racing that the current Monmouth Park opened.

Its location on the shore and as a stop on the North Jersey Coast Line makes it a popular shore destination for residents from New York and North Jersey to see thoroughbred racing. The Haskell Invitational Stakes take place annually in August.

Long Branch

Long Branch developed into a resort town in the late 18th century, with oceanside hotels, large estates, and grand theaters. It was visited by seven United States presidents, including Ulysses S. Grant, Chester A. Arthur, Rutherford B. Hayes, James A. Garfield, Benjamin Harrison, William McKinley, and Woodrow Wilson. All seven worshiped at the Church of the Presidents in the city, and beachside Seven Presidents Park is named for their visits.

Long Branch's popularity waned in the years following World War II, with the opening of the Garden State Parkway in the mid-1950s allowing tourists to access points further south. The defining moment marking the end of this era occurred on June 8, 1987, when a large fire destroyed the town's pier and adjoining amusement park.

In 2005, Pier Village, a Victorian-inspired mixed-use community consisting of rental residences atop retail space, opened. A public grassy area called Festival Plaza is the site of regular events, including concerts, arts & crafts fairs, outdoor movies, and holiday events. Long Branch is also home to Max's Famous Hotdogs and its rival, the original WindMill Hot Dogs, located in a windmill-shaped building since 1963.

Asbury Park

Asbury Park developed through the 1920s and 1930s as a resort destination for the New York metro area, and it remained that way through World War II. The Paramount Theatre and Asbury Park Convention Hall, both connected to the boardwalk via a grand arcade, drew considerable tourists. The post-war era of the 1950s and 1960s saw the construction of the Garden State Parkway and the Monmouth Mall, taking visitors away from Asbury Park and its shopping areas. At the same time, the city's music scene gained prominence with artists like Bruce Springsteen & the E Street Band and Southside Johnny and the Asbury Jukes getting their starts at venues like Asbury Lanes and The Stone Pony, the latter one of New Jersey's best-known music venues. These acts and others led to the development of a subgenre of rock and roll known as the Jersey Shore sound.

Race riots on July 4, 1970, resulted in the destruction of various buildings across the city. A popular indoor amusement complex, Palace Amusements, was closed in 1988 and demolished in 2004, despite multiple attempts to save it. A pair of large murals on the building's side known collectively as "Tillie" became an icon of the Jersey Shore and was saved.

In the 1990s, Asbury Park emerged as a prime LGBT destination, with multiple gay bars and nightclubs, as well as the Empress Hotel, the state's first gay-oriented hotel, opening. Since the early 2000s, a burgeoning crowd of artists along with local political leaders have helped push the town through major redevelopment, which is still ongoing. Asbury Park still retains the lively music scene which made it famous, with newer music venues such as The Saint operating alongside the older stalwarts. Events like the Asbury Music Awards and the Garden State Film Festival continue to draw tourists to the city.

Ocean Grove (Neptune) 

Ocean Grove was originally developed in 1869 as a Methodist summer camp meeting site. Today, it is an unincorporated community located within Neptune Twp. and is listed on the National Register of Historic Places. Ocean Grove is noted for its abundant examples of Victorian architecture. It is home to The Great Auditorium, a 6,250-seat indoor arena constructed out of wood in 1894 on bridge-like iron trusses laid on stone foundations. The Auditorium contains a pipe organ that is one of the 20 largest in the world. Surrounding the Auditorium are 114  tents, which are occupied from May to September, just as they have been since the town's founding. The tents adjoin to rear sheds containing a kitchen and bathroom and are stored in the sheds during the winter. They are in such demand that there is a waiting list of ten years for summer rentals. Ocean Grove was named one of the top 15 best beaches by Fodor's in 2014.

Belmar

Belmar is a popular vacation destination due to its natural and recreational resources. Its boardwalk and town offer shops, restaurants, an active arts scene, sporting events, festivals, and a variety of family-oriented activities. Belmar is also a popular party town for young adults and college students, featuring bars such as D’Jais and Bar Anticipation, which are some of the top-rated in the state. Belmar is among the most popular surf spots on the East Coast, frequently hosting surfing events and competitions.

Spring Lake
Spring Lake is home to many old homes and tree-lined streets, in contrast to the many tourist-oriented towns on the Jersey Shore. During the Gilded Age of the late 19th and early 20th centuries, Spring Lake developed into a coastal resort for members of New York City and Philadelphia high society, in a similar fashion to the communities of Newport, Rhode Island, and Bar Harbor, Maine. Historic buildings from this era include the Martin Maloney Cottage and the Audenried Cottage.

Manasquan

Manasquan has a downtown area with many small businesses. The Algonquin Arts Theatre is a historic 540-seat theatre, built in 1938 as a movie house but converted to a professional live performance space in May 1994. Over the course of the 20th century, traditional beach bungalows were demolished and replaced with much larger single-family dwellings, helping to turn Manasquan into a predominately year-round residential community with less of a focus on summer tourism.

The Manasquan Inlet is the northern terminus of the inland portion of the Intracoastal Waterway. It provides surfers with waves that are corralled, refracted, and enlarged by the jetty protruding out into the Atlantic Ocean.

Ocean County

Point Pleasant Beach

Point Pleasant Beach is situated on the Barnegat Peninsula, a long, narrow barrier peninsula that divides the Barnegat Bay from the Atlantic Ocean at the Manasquan Inlet, and the borough derives its name from this location. The town's boardwalk is approximately one mile long, and its central third is home to Jenkinsons' amusement park, aquarium, and arcades, as well as numerous pizza restaurants, ice cream parlors, games-of-chance, and miniature golf courses. Point Pleasant is home to the first Jersey Mike's sub shop, founded in the town in 1956.

Seaside Heights

Seaside Heights is a resort community, with a beach, an amusement-oriented boardwalk, and numerous clubs and bars making it a popular destination. During the summer, the borough attracts a crowd largely over the age of 21, drawn to a community with boardwalk entertainment and one of the few shore communities with sizable numbers of apartments. In the peak months of July and August, the town's population explodes from around 3,000 residents to between 30,000 and 65,000 people on any given day. South of the town sits Island Beach State Park, the largest reserve of an undeveloped barrier island in New Jersey and one of the largest in the United States.

Casino Pier is an amusement park situated on a pier extending over the Atlantic Ocean. The pier offers many family-friendly attractions and roller coasters, as well as an arcade, games-of-chance, and a rooftop miniature golf course. Across the street, a go-kart track, a new miniature golf course, and a waterpark, Breakwater Beach, round out the attraction list. The rest of the 2-mile (3.2 km) long boardwalk offers various arcades, attractions, souvenir shops, restaurants and food stands.

On October 29, 2012, substantial portions of the boardwalk were damaged and much of the borough was flooded as a result of Hurricane Sandy. Both Casino Pier and Funtown Pier suffered major damage, with sections of both piers torn apart by a powerful storm surge that caused many rides to collapse into the ocean. One such ride, Casino Pier's Star Jet, became a symbol of the storm's destruction as it sat upright in the Atlantic Ocean after the pier washed out below it. A portion of the rebuilt boardwalk and all of Funtown Pier were destroyed in a 2013 fire.

The community is also known as the setting of the hit MTV show Jersey Shore, as well as various editions of MTV True Life and MTV Summer Beach House.

Long Beach Island

The primary industries include tourism, fishing, and real estate. The only access point to the island by car is via the Manahawkin Bay Bridge, locally known as "The Causeway", which carries Route 72 over Manahawkin Bay. Long Beach Island is home to about 20,000 people on a year-round basis. However, the population swells significantly during the summer months and reaches about 100,000 people, including both part-time residents and tourists, who are often referred to as "shoobies". The island's close-knit communities are largely affluent and contain vacation homes for wealthy individuals who reside elsewhere in New Jersey, as well as New York, Pennsylvania, and Connecticut.

The low-density northern end of the Long Beach Island, including the communities of Barnegat Light, Loveladies, Harvey Cedars, and North Beach, are home to an assortment of high-end waterfront vacation homes. The southern end contains significantly more year-round residents and businesses, particularly in the larger boroughs of Beach Haven, Long Beach, and Surf City. Long Beach Island typically attracts a family-oriented crowd during the summertime; the island has not contained a boardwalk since the 1944 hurricane, and nightlife is limited to a few bars. Tourists generally take part in recreational activities like miniature golf, parasailing, jet skiing, and relaxing on the beaches. The island has a reputation as a base for long-range deep-sea fishing and charter boats.

Attractions include the Barnegat Lighthouse, a 165 feet (50 m) tall lighthouse overlooking the Barnegat Inlet, located in a state park at the island's northern tip. A small amusement park, Fantasy Island, serves the surrounding communities, and the original Ron Jon Surf Shop location sits at the foot of the Manahawkin Bay Bridge in Ship Bottom.

Atlantic County

Brigantine
Brigantine is an island community, the northernmost in Atlantic County. The Brigantine Lighthouse, constructed to attract tourists, is a central identifying symbol of the city. Brigantine is home to the Marine Mammal Stranding Center, the state's only rescue center for stranded marine mammals and sea turtles. It has rescued more than 3,900 whales, dolphins, seals and sea turtles since it was formed. Part of the Edwin B. Forsythe National Wildlife Refuge is located on the northern end of the island. The town is named after the numerous shipwrecks in the area, many of which were likely brigantines.

Atlantic City

Atlantic City is a nationally renowned resort city for gambling, shopping and fine dining. In an effort at revitalizing the city, New Jersey voters in 1976 passed a referendum, approving casino gambling for Atlantic City. Today, the city is second to Las Vegas in number of casinos, yearly gaming revenue, and number of casino hotel rooms. Casinos like the Borgata, Harrah's, Caesars, and the Tropicana draw tourists from around the region.

The Atlantic City Boardwalk was one of the first boardwalks of its type in the United States, opening on June 26, 1870. The boardwalk starts at Absecon Inlet and runs along the beach for 4 miles (6 km) to the city limit. An additional  miles (2 km) of the boardwalk extend into neighboring Ventnor City. Casinos and hotels front the boardwalk, as well as stores, restaurants, and attractions.

Events like Thunder over the Boardwalk, as well as more traditional attractions like the Absecon Lighthouse and Lucy the Elephant, bring in additional visitors. Shopping in the city include Playground Pier, Tanger Outlets The Walk, and The Quarter at Tropicana.

Notable landmarks include Boardwalk Hall, an arena and convention center opened in 1929, and Steel Pier, an amusement park on a 1,000 foot (300 m) long pier over the Atlantic Ocean. Home of the Miss America pageant, Atlantic City has been featured in numerous films and television series, most notably as the setting of the 1980 film Atlantic City and the 2011 HBO series Boardwalk Empire. The city also served as the inspiration for the board game Monopoly.

Cape May County

Ocean City

Ocean City is home to a boardwalk with several shops and amusement areas. Known as a family-oriented seaside resort, the city has prohibited the sale of alcoholic beverages within its limits since its founding in 1879. Ocean City has miles of guarded beaches, a 2.5-mile boardwalk, and a downtown shopping and dining district. Gillian's Wonderland Pier and Playland's Castaway Cove are two large amusement parks located along the boardwalk, with both family and thrill rides. A water park, various arcades, miniature golf courses, and a historic entertainment hall, the Ocean City Music Pier, round out the boardwalk attractions. Corson's Inlet State Park was established by the New Jersey Legislature in 1969 to protect and preserve one of the last undeveloped tracts of land along the state's oceanfront.

The Wildwoods

The Wildwoods is used as a collective term for the four communities that have "Wildwood" as part of the municipality name — the Borough of Wildwood Crest, City of Wildwood, Borough of West Wildwood and the City of North Wildwood — together with Diamond Beach, a portion of Lower Township situated on the island. Its most notable features are its beach and  boardwalk, home to the Morey's Piers amusement complex and Raging Waters and Ocean Oasis Waterparks owned by Morey's Piers. The boardwalk features a trolley called the "Tramcar", which runs from end to end.

The Wildwoods is home to over 200 motels, built during the Doo-Wop era of the 1950s and 1960s, in an area recognized by the state of New Jersey, known as the Wildwoods Shore Resort Historic District'

The term doo-wop was coined by Cape May's Mid-Atlantic Center For The Arts in the early 1990s to describe the unique, space-age architectural style, which is also referred to as the Googie or populuxe style. The motels are unique in appearance, with Vegas-like neon signs and fantastic architecture.

Cape May

Cape May is at the southern tip of Cape May Peninsula where the Delaware Bay meets the Atlantic Ocean and is one of the country's oldest vacation resort destinations.

With a rich history, award-winning beaches, designation as a top birding location, and many Victorian structures, Cape May is a seaside resort drawing visitors from around the world. The Cape May – Lewes Ferry connects US 9 from Cape May to Lewes, Delaware.

Beaches

The following is a list of all the towns within the state of New Jersey that have a beach either along the Raritan Bay or Atlantic Ocean, listed north to south:

Most ocean beaches in New Jersey charge admission to the beaches through the use of beach tags. Ocean beaches in New Jersey that do not use beach tags include Atlantic City, Strathmere (Upper Township), North Wildwood, Wildwood, and Wildwood Crest.

Environmental issues

Climate change 

The Jersey shore is expected to have increasing problems with the water supply in part due to saltwater intrusion, and also changes in weather patterns. Communities on the eastern shore are also expected to see significant change in the commercial fisheries along the coast, hurting communities dependent on fishing.

Sea level rise 
The Jersey Shore is particularly vulnerable to sea level rise accelerated by climate change, and will be experiencing more sea level rise than the global average. This is in large part because of the slow down of the Atlantic meridional overturning circulation which will allow sea level rise 2 feet greater than average. The region already experiences frequent flooding during king tides and storm surge, because most infrastructure was built based on 20th century standards. Several academic studies have explore various responses to the sea level rise including managed retreat, improved coastal management practices to mitigate risk, and hard structures.

Hurricane Sandy 

The entirety of the Jersey Shore region was significantly damaged by Hurricane Sandy in October 2012. The devastating effect of the storm surge on property adjacent to the beach resulted in substantial cost to the reinsurance industry which has since advocated avoidance of rebuilding closely packed middle-class residences or flimsy commercial structures adjacent to the beach. The hurricane reached up to 74 mph. Hurricane Sandy's pure kinetic energy for storm surge and wave destruction potential reached a 5.8 out of 6 on the National Oceanic and Atmospheric Administration's scale. Storm surges reached 14 ft above average low tide. The Barrier Islands were especially damaged, leaving dozens of homes completely washed away. Many iconic places from "The Shore" were also damaged due to Hurricane Sandy, including the Belmar boardwalk, Casino Pier, and Funtown Pier.

Retail businesses

Unlike areas in the interior of the state, which has many big box stores and malls, small businesses are a significant portion of the economy of barrier island Jersey Shore towns. This is because small businesses can more easily adapt to the seasonal nature of business in shore towns. Stores that are located at the shore are all unique ranging from psychics and accessories at Ocean City to home-made chocolates in Long Beach Island. In addition, many shore towns deliberately stymie the entry of big box stores because they want to reduce traffic. In addition, many tourists visit shore towns in order to be in an environment without big box stores. In some shore towns, chain retailers such as Wawa design their store designs and operating procedures to match the local aesthetic and shore culture.

Property ownership 
Every town along the Jersey Shore has properties owned by people who do not live in New Jersey. State resident ownership has dropped by 30% since 1989. People from out of state own about 37% of the properties in shore towns. In 10 towns, a majority of the property is owned by out of state residents. Summer tourism swells the population of towns along the shore. Some towns have fewer than 5,000 year-round residents, then explode to more than 30,000 residents during the summer. Monmouth County has the highest percentage of New Jersey resident ownership, at 88%, followed by Ocean County at 80%, 57% in Atlantic County, and only 27% in Cape May County. Avalon has the lowest percentage of state resident ownership at 27.5%, while Monmouth Beach has the highest at 92.7%.

In popular culture

Television 
 The MTV reality series Jersey Shore aired from 2009 to 2012, with seasons one, three, five and six being filmed in Seaside Heights. It became a pop culture phenomenon, with classes and conferences at universities about the show, and journalists listing it as one of the most notable shows of the time. The show debuted amid controversy regarding its use of the terms "Guido/Guidette", its portrayal of Italian-Americans and allegations of perpetuating stereotypes, as well as scrutiny from locals of the cast who were not residents of the area.
 MTV also used Seaside Heights as the location of their Beach House music video block in 1998 and again in 2002, and for two episodes of True Life, in 2003 and 2004. In 2017, the revival of the Beach House music block was filmed in Loveladies and Long Beach Township on Long Beach Island.
 The HBO series The Sopranos featured multiple episodes set at the Jersey Shore, including season four's acclaimed "Whitecaps", which was filmed in Sea Bright and Asbury Park, which appeared in both season two's "Funhouse" and season three's "...To Save Us All from Satan's Power". Other locations featured in the series include Monmouth Beach, Long Branch, and the Borgata in Atlantic City.
 The 1992 Fox TV series Down the Shore, starring Louis Mandylor and Anna Gunn, was set in Belmar.
 Some episodes in season four of The Real Housewives of New Jersey took place at the Jersey Shore. The families of cast members Teresa Giudice and Melissa Gorga have houses in Toms River and Kathy Wakile's family rents a house on the Jersey Shore.
 Jersey Shore Shark Attack is a 2012 Syfy television film set on the Jersey Shore.
 The HBO series "Boardwalk Empire" was largely based on and set during the prohibition era in Atlantic City.
 The FXX series “It’s Always Sunny in Philadelphia” based an episode of theirs in the Jersey Shore.

Film 
 The 2008 Academy Award-nominated film The Wrestler, directed by Darren Aronofsky and starring Mickey Rourke, Marissa Tomei and Evan Rachel Wood, contains scenes in Asbury Park.
 The 1980 French-Canadian film Atlantic City is set in the titular city and stars Susan Sarandon as a casino waitress and Burt Lancaster as an aging former gangster.
 Ocean's Eleven, the 2001 remake of the 1960 Rat Pack heist film, opens with scenes at the Trump Plaza featuring George Clooney and Bernie Mac.
 Warrior
 The Bounty Hunter
 According to Greta
 Clerks
 Greetings From The Shore
 The King of Marvin Gardens
 The Pick-up Artist
 Ragtime

Music 
 The Jersey Shore is home to numerous rock and roll clubs, most famously in Asbury Park, where Bruce Springsteen honed his skills at [[now defunct clubs like The Upstage and the Student Prince. He still makes periodic live appearances at The Stone Pony bar and Convention Hall, performing either as a solo act, with the E Street Band, or with other artists. Bill Haley and the Comets performed "Rock Around the Clock" for the first time live at the Hoff Brau in Wildwood.
 A style of music known as the Jersey Shore sound evolved from the Jersey Shore. Bruce Springsteen's songs "4th of July, Asbury Park (Sandy)" and "Jersey Girl" are two of several Springsteen songs that includes references to the Jersey shore scene of the early 1970s.
 The Sea.Hear.Now Festival is held annually on Asbury Park's beach.

References

External links

 Historic Jersey Shore Lighthouses 
 New Jersey Shore Events, History Hotels, Dining and Articles
 17 New Jersey Shore Newspapers serving Atlantic and Cape May Counties
 Highlights New Jersey Shore Events and activities

 
Culture of Philadelphia
Seaside resorts in the United States
Geography of Atlantic County, New Jersey
Geography of Cape May County, New Jersey
Geography of Monmouth County, New Jersey
Geography of Ocean County, New Jersey
Regions of New Jersey
Tourism in New Jersey
Tourism regions of New Jersey
Tourist attractions in Atlantic County, New Jersey
Tourist attractions in Cape May County, New Jersey
Tourist attractions in Monmouth County, New Jersey
Tourist attractions in Ocean County, New Jersey